Katharina Althaus (born 23 May 1996) is a German ski jumper.

She is an individual world champion (with additional six team titles) and two time olympic runner-up.

In Planica 2023 she became the first and only ski jumper in history, both men and women, with at least four medals in total, achieved at a single FIS Nordic World Ski Championships.

Career
She has competed at World Cup level since the 2011/12 season. She finished 2nd in the 2017/18 and 2018/19 World Cup overall, and won individual silver medals at the 2018 and 2022 Winter Olympics.

She became the mixed team ski jumping world champion together with her German team mates Carina Vogt, Richard Freitag, and Severin Freund in Falun at the FIS Nordic World Ski Championships 2015. She took her first World Cup win on 12 February 2017 in Ljubno.

At the FIS Nordic World Ski Championships 2023 in Planica she won medals in all four disciplines (two Individual and two team events), three gold and one bronze medal.

Major Tournament results

Winter Olympics

FIS Nordic World Ski Championships

World Cup

Standings

Wins

References

External links

1996 births
Living people
German female ski jumpers
Olympic ski jumpers of Germany
Ski jumpers at the 2014 Winter Olympics
Ski jumpers at the 2018 Winter Olympics
Ski jumpers at the 2022 Winter Olympics
Medalists at the 2018 Winter Olympics
Medalists at the 2022 Winter Olympics
Olympic silver medalists for Germany
Olympic medalists in ski jumping
People from Oberstdorf
Sportspeople from Swabia (Bavaria)
Ski jumpers at the 2012 Winter Youth Olympics
Youth Olympic gold medalists for Germany
FIS Nordic World Ski Championships medalists in ski jumping
21st-century German women